McKinnon Island is a large island, mostly ice-covered, in the Hannan Ice Shelf along the coast of Enderby Land, Antarctica. It was plotted from air photos taken by the Australian National Antarctic Research Expeditions in 1956, and was named for Graeme W. McKinnon, Geographical Officer of the Antarctic Division, Melbourne, and Secretary of the Antarctic Names Committee of Australia.

See also 
 List of Antarctic and sub-Antarctic islands

References

Islands of Enderby Land